KWYG-LP (98.5 FM) is a low-power FM radio station broadcasting a Religious format, consisting of Southern Gospel, Bluegrass Gospel and Country Gospel music with Bible teaching programs. Licensed to Cheyenne, Wyoming, US, the station is currently owned by Faith Baptist Church, Cheyenne, Wyoming.

References

External links
 

WYG-LP
Radio stations established in 2015
2015 establishments in Wyoming
WYG-LP
Cheyenne, Wyoming
Baptist Christianity in Wyoming